A Chinese wall is an information barrier protocol established within an organization to prohibit exchanges of information between persons whose interaction might produce conflicts of interest.  The term may also refer to:

In China
The Great Wall of China, massive series of fortifications in northern China built to defend against nomadic peoples living to the north of the wall.
Chinese city wall, defensive systems used to protect towns and cities in China in pre-modern times

In geography
Chinese Wall (Idaho), a peak in the White Cloud Mountains, Idaho
Chinese Wall (Montana), a 1,000 foot high, 15-mile long escarpment along the Continental Divide in the Bob Marshall Wilderness, Montana
Chinese Wall, a former stone viaduct and barrier on the site of the current Penn Center, Philadelphia

In media and entertainment
The Chinese Wall, a play by Max Frisch
Chinese Wall (album), the 1984 album by Philip Bailey
"Chinese Wall" (Mad Men), the eleventh episode of the fourth season of the television series Mad Men

In computing and security
 Brewer and Nash model, a multi-lateral computer security policy
 Golden Shield Project, also called National Public Security Work Informational Project, China's project for censorship and surveillance
 Great Firewall, a nickname for restrictions on internet access in China
 Chinese room, an argument for the existence of limitations on artificial intelligence systems

Other
Chinese architecture for walls in Chinese buildings
Chinese drywall, a building material known for causing health problems between 2001 and 2009
Wall (Chinese constellation), in Chinese astrology, one of the northern mansions of the Black Tortoise
A German tag game from the 19th century; see

See also
 Great Wall (disambiguation)
 Long Wall (disambiguation)